= Puckman =

Puckman may refer to:

- Pac-Man, whose original Japanese name was PUCKMAN
- RPI Engineers men's ice hockey mascot, Puckman
